The Pool Energetique De L'Afrique Centrale (PEAC), also Central African Power Pool, is an association of ten Central African countries. The major aim of the association is to interconnect the electricity grids of the member countries in order to facilitate the trading of electric power between the members. PEAC is one of the five regional power pools in Africa.

Location
The headquarters of CAPP are located on the 14th Floor of 
Nabemba Tower, in the city of Brazzaville, the capital and largest city in the Republic of the Congo. The geographical coordinates of CAPP's headquarters are 4°16'19.0"S, 15°17'22.0"E (Latitude:-4.271944; Longitude:15.289444).

Overview
Member countries are Angola, Burundi, Cameroon, Republic of the Congo, Central African Republic, Chad, Democratic Republic of the Congo, Gabon, Equatorial Guinea, and São Tomé and Príncipe. The energy compact was established in 2003 and focuses on developing electricity interconnections between member states.

Members
The member countries and their respective electricity utility companies are listed in the table below.

See also

 Southern African Power Pool 
 Eastern Africa Power Pool
 West African Power Pool
 North African Power Pool

References

External links
 Website of Central African Power Pool

Energy in Africa
Electricity markets
Organizations established in 2003
2003 establishments in the Republic of the Congo